The Ericson 29 is an American sailboat that was designed by Bruce King as a cruiser and first built in 1970.

Production
The design was built by Ericson Yachts in the United States between 1970 and 1978, but it is now out of production.

Design

The Ericson 29 is a recreational keelboat, built predominantly of fiberglass, with wood trim. It has a masthead sloop rig, a raked stem; a raised counter, angled transom; an internally mounted spade-type rudder controlled by a tiller or optional wheel and a fixed fin keel. It displaces  and carries  of ballast.

A tall rig with  mast about  higher was a factory option for areas with lighter winds.

The boat is fitted with a Universal Atomic 4  gasoline engine for docking and maneuvering.

The design has sleeping accommodation for five people, with a double "V"-berth in the bow cabin and two straight settee quarter berths in the main cabin along with a drop-leaf table and one quarter berth aft on the starboard side. The galley is located on the port side just forward of the companionway ladder. The galley is "L"-shaped and is equipped with an ice box and a sink. The head is located just aft of the bow cabin on the starboard side.

See also
List of sailing boat types

References

External links

Ericson 29 interior video tour

Keelboats
1970s sailboat type designs
Sailing yachts
Sailboat type designs by Bruce King
Sailboat types built by Ericson Yachts